Destroyer's Rubies is the seventh studio album by Canadian indie rock band Destroyer, released on February 21, 2006 on Merge Records, Scratch Records, Acuarela Discos, Architecture, and Rough Trade Records.

Musical style
Dan Bejar has stated that Destroyer's Rubies was intended to sound "Like a band playing in a room." He also called the album a "very natural record," noting that he embraced traditional songwriters such as Bob Dylan along with "image-heavy rants, but with a melodious, loping, folk-rock background." Lyrically, Bejar stated that the rest of the band is "coughing up so much melody" that he could do whatever he wanted with the words; the album was the "apex of [the lyrics] dueling with the music." Pitchfork noted the use of stark acoustic guitar, and The New York Times described the album and as "elegant, shaggy version of classic rock," emphasizing the use of baritone saxophone, a tambourine, and Bejar's "weird, yelpy voice."

Release
The album peaked at #24 on Billboard's Top Heatseekers music chart, and made it to #30 on the magazine's Top Independent Albums chart.

Reception

Destroyer's Rubies received widespread acclaim from contemporary music critics. At Metacritic, which assigns a normalized rating out of 100 to reviews from mainstream critics, the album received an average score of 88, based on 30 reviews, which indicates "universal acclaim". Matt LeMay of Pitchfork gave the album a very favorable review, stating: "The album is structurally complex, thematically dense, and labyrinthine in its self-referentiality. Dan Bejar's vocals are, like many of his indie contemporaries, yelpy and dramatic, and many of his lyrics seem preordained to serve as mp3 blog headers. In other words, the qualities that once made Destroyer albums so 'difficult' make Destroyer's Rubies a perfect record for this critical moment."

Pitchfork placed Destroyer's Rubies at number 158 on their list of the top 200 albums of the 2000s.

Track listing

Personnel
Dan Bejar
Ted Bois
Nicolas Bragg
Tim Loewen
Scott Morgan
Fisher Rose
John Collins

Notes

2006 albums
Destroyer (band) albums
Merge Records albums
Albums produced by John Collins (Canadian musician)
Albums produced by David Carswell